New India was an early 20th century daily newspaper published in India by  Annie Besant, to highlight issues related to the Indian freedom struggle.

Overview
New India was a newspaper founded as a means to spread news related to the Indian freedom struggle, and as a means to vocalize the views of its founder, the freedom fighter Dr. Annie Besant, through her editorials. It was in the same league as Gandhi's Harijan and Tilak's Kesari.

History
Annie Besant was a London born half Irish half English, pro workers union, pro Irish independence woman who happened to first come to India in November 1893. She had helped start the first trade unions in London, was a member of the Fabian Society and a close associate of a number of socialists of her time including Sydney Webbs, George Bernard Shaw, George Lansbury and Ramsay MacDonald. In 1866, she read two theosophical books written by Mr A. P. Sinnet, and in 1889 read Mme H. P. Blavatsky's ‘The Secret Doctrine’. These influenced her greatly and she came to India. In May 1889, Besant joined the Theosophical Society in Madras, and became Blavatsky's pupil and helper. She gradually became a prominent worker of the Theosophical Society and was elected president, a position that she held until her death in September 1933.

In October 1913, Besant spoke at a public meeting in Madras recommending that there should be a Standing Committee of the House of Commons for Indian affairs which would go into the question of how India might attain freedom. Realising that a newspaper would help propagate her political thoughts, she founded a weekly newspaper in January 1914. In June 1914 she purchased an existing newspaper called 'Madras Standard' and renamed it 'New India'. The New India subsequently became her chosen organ for her tempestuous propaganda for India's freedom, and was widely read by the English educated Indian middle and upper classes, post world war when the Indian freedom struggle was beginning to gather momentum.

Activities and Political stance

New India was a pro Indian freedom newspaper, which simultaneously worked as a mouthpiece for the views of its founder Dr. Annie Besant. During and after the First world war, the return to Gandhi to India, the involvement of Indian masses in the Indian freedom struggle (which until then had generally remained a topic of discussion only for the English speaking upper class Indians) and the vociferous involvement of Bipin Chandra Pal, Bal Gangadhar Tilak, Lala Lajpat Rai, Gopal Krishna Gokhale, Motilal Nehru, Jawaharlal Nehru and others, the Indian freedom struggle began to gather momentum in places other than Delhi, Calcutta and Bombay. In 1914, Besant vocalized the idea of the inclusion of more Indians in making decisions related to India at a political and economic level. She called this freedom 'Home Rule', similar to the home rule movement in Ireland.

She began to be active in the Indian National Congress, as a delegate as well as a member of various committees. In 1915, in a meeting in Bombay, she explained her plan for the establishment of the Home Rule League. This work intensified in 1916, as people began to eagerly read the 'New India' for news of the progress of the Indian freedom movement and to read Dr Besant's editorials in the paper. At that time, popular English newspapers like The Times of India used to usually publish pro-British news to cater to its primarily pro colonial advertisers and readers. Hence there was an urgent need to have English language newspapers that could publish news related to the Indian freedom struggle and the people involved in it. New India's readers thus consisted mainly of the educated English speaking middle and upper class Indians as well as foreigners sympathetic to the cause of India's freedom.

Besant started the Home Rule League was on 1 September 1916, announcing it in New India. Bal Gangadhar Tilak too had formed a similar Home League. Due to its danger to the British empire, Tilak was exiled and in June 1917, Besant was interned in Ootacamund with two principal workers G. S. Arundale and B. P. Wadia, thus interrupting the publishing of New India. However, due to widescale protests all over India and abroad, the internment order was withdrawn, and in August 1917 Besant was made the President of the Calcutta Session of the Indian National Congress. As a result of her campaign and because of the pressure of public opinion in India, the Montagu - Chelmsford proposals were enacted by the British Parliament which created a few nominal openings for Indians in certain local councils.

However, Besant favoured changing laws to encourage the participation of Indians in the governance of India, and did not favour the breaking of laws set by the British administration. Thus, when 1920 Gandhi launched Satyagraha in 1920 in Lahore, Besant stood against it. A lifetime of fighting by constitutional means and within the law had left her with a deep distrust of massive law - breaking in whatever cause it might be. Again, New India became a mode through which Besant could vocalize her justification of her views. Gradually, as Besant held on to views opposed to the general sway of public, her popularity and New India's popularity waned. However, her creative work for India continued, mostly reflected in her writings in New India. Between 1922 and 1924, in consultation with her colleagues Tej Bahadur Sapru, C. P. Ramaswami Aiyar, P. S. Sivaswami Aiyar, V. S. Srinivasa Sastri, Purshottamdas Thakurdas and Hari Singh Gour, most of them knights of the British empire who advocated more participation of Indians in the existing British colonial order, she drafted the "Commonwealth of India Bill" which was presented in the Parliament in London by George Lansbury in December 1925. Parts of it were published in New India, however it did not go beyond the first reading stage.

References

Daily newspapers published in India
Defunct newspapers published in India
Publications established in 1914
Publications disestablished in 1947